Bevins is a surname of Welsh origin, meaning 'the son of Evan.'.

Anthony Bevins British journalist
Charles L. Bevins a British born, American architect.
Christopher Bevins an American voice actor and ADR director.
(John) Reginald Bevins a British politician.
Stuart Bevins a former English cricketer.
John Bevins Moisant a United States aviator of French-Canadian descent.

References

See also
Beavan
Bevin (disambiguation)
Bevan
Bevins Prize

Anglicised Welsh-language surnames